Penicillium atramentosum is a fungus species of the genus of Penicillium which produces tannase.

See also
List of Penicillium species

Further reading

References

atramentosum
Fungi described in 1910
Taxa named by Charles Thom